Channel Q (stylized as CHANNEL Q) is an LGBT lifestyle talk and EDM top 40 radio network created, owned, and operated by Audacy, Inc.  The network airs on the Audacy internet radio service, as well as on Audacy-owned terrestrial radio stations throughout the United States.  Channel Q's programming schedule consists of LGBT-centered talk shows, most notably a rebooted version of Loveline, along with Dance/Top 40 music on afternoons, late nights, and weekends.

History
Channel Q started life as Out Now Radio, and soft-launched in August 2018 on Radio.com as well as the HD Radio signal of Entercom's KAMP-FM in Los Angeles (97.1FM-HD2).  A full launch occurred on October 11, 2018, a date chosen to coincide with National Coming Out Day, and featured a daily morning program co-hosted by Queer Eye alum Jai Rodriguez; weekly shows featuring internet personality B. Scott and lawyer/politician John Duran; and a revamped version of the syndicated radio program Loveline.  By November 1, the network would adopt the Channel Q name, tweak its program lineup, and add its first analog radio affiliate (KQPS in Palm Springs, CA).

Programming
Brian Holt is Channel Q’s original architect and founding Program Director/Operations Manager. Prior to joining the network, Holt developed programming for iHeartMedia including Live from the Lounge w/Ryan Seacrest, Valentine in the Morning, The Bill Carroll Show, The Dr. Wendy Walsh Show, and HOME w/Dean Sharp the House Whisperer.

As of March 2020, Channel Q's program schedule features early morning, afternoon, and weekend blocks of Top 40, pop, EDM, and dance music along with regularly-scheduled shows.

Terrestrial radio affiliates
In addition to being heard on the Audacy internet radio platform, its related app, and the network's website, Channel Q is also heard on the over-the-air stations listed below.  Those shown with an "HD2" or "HD3" suffix air Channel Q on an HD radio subchannel that can be heard through HD-accommodating receivers.

Station list

Former affiliates

Asterisk (*) indicates HD Radio broadcast.
Gray background indicates low-power FM translator.
KQPS also served as Channel Q’s monitored reporter on Billboard’s Dance/Mix Show Airplay panel.

See also
Pride Radio, a competing LGBT-oriented radio service owned and operated by iHeartMedia

References

HD Radio
Audacy, Inc. radio stations
LGBT-related radio stations
Radio stations established in 2018
2010s LGBT-related mass media